Nicocles (d. 306 BC) was a king of Paphos on the island of Cyprus. As king, Nicocles changed the capital of Paphos, from the old one to the new one. In 321 BC, he allied himself with Ptolemy I to fight against Perdiccas and Antigonus.

In 310 BC, after Ptolemy had established his power over the whole island of Cyprus, Nicocles entered into secret negotiations with Antigonus. Hereupon, the Egyptian monarch, alarmed lest the spirit of disaffection should spread to other cities, dispatched two of his friends, Argaeus and Kallikrates, to Cyprus. They surrounded the palace of Paphos with an armed force, and commanded Nicocles to put an end to his own life, an order with which, after a vain attempt at explanation, he was obliged to comply. Nikokles and his brothers hanged themselves. After her husband had killed himself, Axiothea of Paphos, his wife, slew her virgin daughters to prevent them from falling into the hands of the Greeks. Then, together with her sisters-in-law, she set fire to the palace and perished in the flames so that not even their bodies could fall in the hands of their enemies.

Ancient sources 
 Isocrates, Nicocles or the Cyprians
 Diodorus Siculurs, Bibliotheca Historica (Diod. Sic. xx. 21)
Polyaenus, Strategemata (VIII, 48).

References
Dictionary of Greek and Roman Biography and Mythology
Harper's Dictionary of Classical Antiquities

4th-century BC births
300s BC deaths
Year of birth missing
4th-century BC Greek people
Ancient Greek rulers
Kings of ancient Cyprus
Suicides by hanging in Cyprus